The 1992 African Cup of Nations Final was a football match that took place on 26 January 1992, at the Stade de l'Amitié in Dakar, Senegal, to determine the winner of the 1992 African Cup of Nations. Ivory Coast defeated Ghana 11–10 on penalties after a goalless draw to win their first African Cup.

The penalty shootout was notable as the first time that every player on the field took a penalty in a major international final. This would be repeated again when the two teams met in the 2015 final in another Ivorian victory.

Then current African Footballer of the Year and the tournament's best player, Abedi Pele was suspended and did not play for Ghana.

Road to the final

Match

Details

References

External links
Details at RSSSF

Final
1992
1992
1992
1991–92 in Ghanaian football
1992 in Ivorian football
Africa Cup of Nations Final 1992
January 1992 sports events in Africa